

Films

References

LGBT
1979 in LGBT history
1979
1979